This article serves as an index – as complete as possible – of all the honorific orders or similar decorations awarded by Sweden, classified by Monarchies chapter and Republics chapter, and, under each chapter, recipients' countries and the detailed list of recipients.

Awards

MONARCHIES

Swedish Royal Family   
 Carl XVI Gustaf of Sweden :
 Lord and Master (and Knight with Collar) of the Order of the Seraphim
 Lord and Master (and Commander Grand Cross) of the Order of the Polar Star
 Lord and Master (and Commander Grand Cross) of the Order of the Sword (dormant order)
 Lord and Master (and Commander Grand Cross) of the Order of Vasa (dormant order)
 Lord and Master (and Knight) of the Order of Charles XIII
 Queen Silvia of Sweden : Knight of the Order of the Seraphim
 Victoria, Crown Princess of Sweden : Member with Collar of the Royal Order of the Seraphim (14 July 1995)
 Prince Daniel, Duke of Västergötland : Knight of the Royal Order of the Seraphim (19/06/2010)
 Princess Estelle, Duchess of Östergötland : Knight of the Royal Order of the Seraphim (Christening, 22. May 2012)
 Prince Carl Philip, Duke of Värmland :
 Knight of the Order of Charles XIII (since birth, 13 May 1979)
 Knight with Collar of the Royal Order of the Seraphim (13 May 1997)
 Princess Madeleine, Duchess of Hälsingland and Gästrikland : Member of the Order of the Seraphim
 Christopher O'Neill : Commander of the Order of the Polar Star (KNO, 2013) 
 Princess Margaretha, Mrs. Ambler : Member of the Order of the Seraphim
 Princess Birgitta, Princess of Hohenzollern : Member of the Order of the Seraphim
 Princess Désirée, Baroness Silfverschiöld : Member of the Order of the Seraphim
 Princess Christina, Mrs. Magnuson : Member of the Order of the Seraphim

European monarchies

British Royal Family 
 The Queen : 19531975 - Member (LSerafO) ;  1975 - Member with Collar (LSerafO m kedja) of the Order of the Seraphim
 The Prince of Wales : 1975 – - Knight of the Order of the Seraphim - RSerafO
 The Duke of Gloucester : 1975 - Commander Grand Cross of the Order of the Polar Star
 The Duke of Kent : Knight of the Order of Charles XIII (2000)

Norwegian Royal Family 
See also decorations pages (mark °) : Harald, Sonja, Haakon, Mette-Marit, Mârtha Louise, Astrid & Ragnhild

 Harald V of Norway: Knight with Collar of the Order of the Seraphim° 
 Queen Sonja of Norway: Member of the Order of the Seraphim° 
 Haakon, Crown Prince of Norway: Knight of the Order of the Seraphim ° 
 Mette-Marit, Crown Princess of Norway: Commander Grand Cross of the Order of the Polar Star° 
 Princess Märtha Louise of Norway: Commander Grand Cross of the Order of the Polar Star°
 Princess Astrid of Norway: Commander Grand Cross of the Order of the Polar Star°

Danish Royal Family 

 Margrethe II of Denmark : Member of the Order of the Seraphim
 Frederik, Crown Prince of Denmark : Knight of the Order of the Seraphim
 Mary, Crown Princess of Denmark : Commander Grand Cross of the Order of the Polar Star
 Prince Joachim of Denmark : Commander Grand Cross of the Order of the Polar Star
 Princess Benedikte of Denmark : Commander Grand Cross of the Order of the Polar Star

Dutch Royal Family 

 King Willem-Alexander of the Netherlands : Knight of the Royal Order of the Seraphim (2006)
 Queen Máxima of the Netherlands : Commander Grand Cross of the Order of the Polar Star (2009)
 Princess Beatrix of the Netherlands : Member with Collar of the Royal Order of the Seraphim (1987)
 Princess Margriet of the Netherlands : Commander Grand Cross of the Order of the Polar Star
 Pieter van Vollenhoven : Commander Grand Cross of the Order of the Polar Star

Belgian Royal Family 

 King Philippe :  Knight of the Order of the Seraphim (2001)
 Queen Mathilde :  Commander Grand Cross of the Order of the Polar Star (2001)
 King Albert II : Knight of the Order of the Seraphim 
 Queen Paola : Member of the Order of the Seraphim (2001) 
 Princess Astrid : Commander Grand Cross of the Order of the Polar Star (2001)
 Prince Lorenz : Commander Grand Cross of the Order of the Polar Star (2001) 
 Prince Laurent : Commander Grand Cross of the Order of the Polar Star (2001)

Luxembourgish Grand-Ducal Family 

 Henri, Grand Duke of Luxembourg : Knight with Collar of the Order of the Seraphim 
 Maria Teresa, Grand Duchess of Luxembourg : Knight of the Order of the Seraphim

Spanish Royal Family 

 Juan Carlos I of Spain : Knight of the Order of the Seraphim
 Queen Sofía of Spain : Member of the Order of the Seraphim
 Felipe, Prince of Asturias : Knight of the Order of the Seraphim

Asian monarchies

Jordanian Royal Family 

 Queen Noor of Jordan : Member of the Royal Order of the Seraphim (15.9.1989) 
 Abdullah II of Jordan : Knight of the Royal Order of the Seraphim (7 October 2003) 
 Queen Rania of Jordan : Member of the Royal Order of the Seraphim 
 Prince Ali Bin Al-Hussein, son of Queen Alia of Jordan, half-brother of Abdullah II of Jordan : Commander Grand Cross of the Order of the Polar Star(7.10.2003) 
 Prince Hassan bin Talal, youngest brother of King Hussein I of Jordan : Commander Grand Cross of the Order of the Polar Star (8.9.1989) 
 Knight of the Royal Order of the Seraphim ??? 
 Princess Sarvath El Hassan, Hassan's wife : Commander Grand Cross of the Order of the Polar Star
 Basma bint Talal, sister of  King Hussein I of Jordan : Commander Grand Cross of the Order of the Polar Star (7.10.2003)

Thai Royal Family 

 King Maha Vajiralongkorn of Thailand : Knight of the Royal Order of the Seraphim
 Queen Sirikit of Thailand :  Member of the Royal Order of the Seraphim
 Princess Sirindhorn of Thailand : Member of the Royal Order of the Seraphim
 Princess Chulabhorn Walailak of Thailand : Member of the Royal Order of the Seraphim

Bruneian Royal Family 

 Hassanal Bolkiah : Knight of the Royal Order of the Seraphim (7.2.2004)
 Queen Saleha : Commander Grand Cross of the Order of the Polar Star (7.2.2004)

Japanese Imperial Family 

 Emperor Akihito : Knight with Collar of the Royal Order of the Seraphim
 Empress Michiko : Member of the Royal Order of the Seraphim
 Crown Prince Naruhito : Knight of the Royal Order of the Seraphim
 Princess Akishino (Kiko) : Commander Grand Cross of the Order of the Polar Star

See also 
 List of current Knights of the Order of the Seraphim
 Mirror page : List of honours of the Swedish Royal Family by country

References 

 
Sweden